Events from the year 1800 in Germany.

Incumbents

Holy Roman Empire 
 Francis II (5 July 17926 August 1806)

Important Electors
 Bavaria – Maximilian I (16 February 17996 August 1806)
 Saxony – Frederick Augustus I (17 December 176320 December 1806)

Kingdoms 
 Kingdom of Prussia
 Monarch – Frederick William III of Prussia (16 November 17977 June 1840)

Grand Duchies 
 Grand Duke of Mecklenburg-Schwerin
 Frederick Francis I– (24 April 17851 February 1837)
 Grand Duke of Mecklenburg-Strelitz
 Charles II (2 June 17946 November 1816)
 Grand Duke of Oldenburg
 Wilhelm (6 July 17852 July 1823) Wilhelm, who suffered from mental illness, was duke in name only, with his cousin Peter, Prince-Bishop of Lübeck, acting as regent throughout his entire reign.
 Peter I (2 July 182321 May 1829)
 Grand Duke of Saxe-Weimar
 Karl August  (1758–1809) Raised to grand duchy in 1809

Principalities 
 Schaumburg-Lippe
 George William (13 February 17871860)
 Schwarzburg-Rudolstadt
 Louis Frederick II (13 April 179328 April 1807)
 Schwarzburg-Sondershausen
 Günther Friedrich Karl I (14 October 179419 August 1835)
 Principality of Reuss-Greiz
 Heinrich XIII (28 June 180029 January 1817)
 Waldeck and Pyrmont
 Friedrich Karl August  (29 August 176324 September 1812)

Duchies 
 Duke of Anhalt-Dessau
 Leopold III (16 December 17519 August 1817)
 Duke of Saxe-Altenburg
 Duke of Saxe-Hildburghausen (1780–1826) – Frederick
 Duke of Saxe-Coburg-Saalfeld
 Francis (8 September 18009 December 1806)
 Duke of Saxe-Meiningen
 Georg I (1782–1803)
 Duke of Schleswig-Holstein-Sonderburg-Beck
 Frederick Charles Louis (24 February 177525 March 1816)
Duke of Württemberg
 Frederick I (22 December 179730 October 1816)

Other
 Landgrave of Hesse-Darmstadt
 Louis I (6 April 179014 August 1806)

Events 

 2 April – Ludwig van Beethoven's Symphony No. 1 premieres at the Burgtheater, in Vienna.
 May 3
 Battle of Stockach: French victory
 Battle of Engen: French victory
 4–5 May– Battle of Messkirch: French victory
 9 May – Battle of Biberach: French victory
 15 May – Battle of Erbach: French victory
 19 June – War of the Second Coalition: Battle of Höchstädt – General Jean Victor Marie Moreau leads French forces to victory, opening the Danube passageway to Vienna.
 27 June – Battle of Neuburg: French victory
 22 November – War of the Second Coalition: Hostilities resume.
 1 December – Battle of Ampfing
 3 December – War of the Second Coalition: Battle of Hohenlinden – The French army defeats Habsburg and Bavarian troops.

Births 

 26 January – Johann Gerhard Oncken, German Baptist preacher (died 1884)
 3 March – Heinrich Georg Bronn, German geologist, paleontologist (died 1862)
 10 March – Victor Aimé Huber, German social reformer (died 1869)
 17 March – Rudolf Ewald Stier, German Protestant churchman, mystic (died 1862)
 20 March – Gottfried Bernhardy, German philologist, literary historian (died 1875)
 25 March – Ernst Heinrich Karl von Dechen, German geologist, mineralogist (died 1889)
 28 March – Johann Georg Wagler, German herpetologist (died 1832)
 16 April – Jakob Heine, German orthopaedist (died 1879)
 30 May – Karl Wilhelm Feuerbach, German geometer (died 1834)
 31 July – Friedrich Wöhler, German chemist (died 1882)
 20 August – Bernhard Heine, German physician, bone specialist and inventor (died 1846)
 26 October – Helmuth von Moltke the Elder, German Field Marshal (died 1891)

Approximate date 
 Abraham Rice, German-born rabbi, first ordained rabbi to serve in the United States (died 1862)

Deaths 

 3 January – Count Karl-Wilhelm Finck von Finckenstein, Prime Minister of Prussia (born 1714)
 6 January – Friedrich Adolf Riedesel, German soldier (born 1738)
 11 January – Kyra Frosini, Greek heroine  (born 1773)
 16 January – Johann Christian Wiegleb, German chemist (born 1732)
 4 February – Charlotte Sophie of Aldenburg, Countess of Varel and Kniphausen (born 1715)
 20 June – Abraham Gotthelf Kästner, German mathematician (born 1719)
 28 June – Heinrich XI, Prince Reuss of Greiz, German noble (born 1722)
 10 September – Johann David Schoepff, German naturalist, doctor (born 1752)
 4 October – Johann Hermann, German physician, naturalist (born 1738)

References 

Years of the 19th century in Germany
 
Germany
Germany